David S. Ingalls Rink is a hockey rink in New Haven, Connecticut, designed by architect Eero Saarinen and built between 1953 and 1958 for Yale University. It is commonly referred to as The Whale, due to its shape. The building was constructed for $1.5 million, which was double its original cost estimate. The building is named for David S. Ingalls, Yale class of 1920, and David S. Ingalls, Jr., Yale class of 1956, both of whom were hockey captains. Members of the Ingalls family were the primary benefactors of the arena. The building was included on the America's Favorite Architecture list, created in 2007 by the American Institute of Architects.

Structural system

The rink employs an innovative structural system employing a 90-meter reinforced concrete arch, a catenary arch form for which Saarinen's projects became known. From the arch a cable net is strung, supporting a timber roof. This causes a stable, double curvature form. Exterior cables linking the arch directly to the outer edges of the roof were added during structural design development.  These cables address forces caused by asymmetrical wind loads. Fred N. Severud was the structural engineer for the project.

Bombing
On May 1, 1970, several rock bands were playing a concert in Ingalls Rink as part of the protests on New Haven Green against the Black Panther trials. Shortly before midnight and towards the end of the concert, two bombs exploded in the north end of the rink's basement. The explosions caused no injuries, but shattered the building's glass doors and caused cracks to form in its arch. No culprit was ever identified, and both Yale President Kingman Brewster and New Haven Police Chief James Ahern contended that either pro- or anti-Panther partisans could have planted the devices.

Renovations

The building has been renovated by Kevin Roche and Roche-Dinkeloo, the firm which is a direct outgrowth of Eero Saarinen and Associates. In 1991, a new concrete refrigerant slab was added at a cost of $1.5 million. 

The lower level interior would also be decorated with photos displaying the history of Yale hockey. These renovations were completed in 2009.

See also
Yale Bulldogs men's ice hockey
Yale Bulldogs women's ice hockey
 Tensile architecture
 Tensile and membrane structures
 Thin-shell structure
 List of thin shell structures
 Salle Frédéric-Lawson-Body, a sports arena in Poitiers, France, whose design was inspired by Ingalls Rink

References

External links
 
Yale Bulldogs official Ingalls Rink site

Yale Bulldogs ice hockey
Yale University buildings
Indoor ice hockey venues in the United States
College ice hockey venues in the United States
Eero Saarinen structures
Indoor arenas in Connecticut
Tensile membrane structures
Modernist architecture in Connecticut
Sports venues in New Haven, Connecticut
1958 establishments in Connecticut